Connie Arismendi (born 1955) is a Chicana visual artist who works primarily in sculpture and mixed media installations.

Early life and education 
Arismendi is the daughter of a Mexican mother and a Filipino father. They moved frequently before settling down in Corpus Christi, Texas. She lives and works in Austin, Texas. She earned her BFA from the University of Texas and her MFA from School of the Art Institute of Chicago.

Art career 
Her inspiration stems from her attraction to or interest in an object rather than an abstract concept. The goal of her artwork is to provoke an emotional response or recollection from the viewer.

In 1999, her exhibition Ascent of Memory was the final show for the Galería Sin Fronteras in Austin, Texas.

Her artworks La Noche en Sevilla, Bishounen (Beautiful Boy), and Sevilla are in the permanent collection of the United States Embassy in Belmopan, Belize.

She formed a partnership with Laura Garanzuay to form Arismendi Garanzuay Studio in 2005. Together, they created                                                                         Rayo de Esperanza/A Beacon of Hope: Cesar E. Chavez Memorial Sculpture.

She made an aluminum sculpture for the Austin Public Library Terrazas Branch. The aluminum plate screen fixture was made in the style of papel picado.

Exhibitions 

 ¡Arte Caliente! Selections from the Joe A. Diaz Collection. March 26, 2006 – June 11, 2006. San Jose Museum of Art
 No Absolutes: Contemporary Art from the Region. October 8, 2000 - January 7, 2001Arizona State University Art Museum, Tempe, AZ.

Collections 

 Polk Museum of Art
 Art Museum of South Texas

References 

1955 births
Living people
20th-century American women artists
21st-century American women artists
American people of Mexican descent
American women sculptors
People from Corpus Christi, Texas
School of the Art Institute of Chicago alumni
Sculptors from Texas
University of Texas at Austin alumni
Wikipedia Student Program